Silvio Ballarin (1901 – 1969) was an Italian mathematician and university professor.

He was born in Zara (today Zadar) in 1901, which at the time was still part of Austria-Hungary. He graduated in mathematics from the University of Bologna in 1924. Ballarin taught topography at the University of Pisa starting from 1950. He was principally interested in gravimetry and geodesy. Ballarin performed many gravimetric measurements in Italy.

References

Bibliography 
 
 

1901 births
1969 deaths
Dalmatian Italians
Italian mathematicians
Academic staff of the University of Pisa
People from Zadar
University of Bologna alumni